John Victor Schmitt (December 23, 1901 – June 13, 1991) was an American rower who competed in the 1928 Summer Olympics.

In 1928 he won the bronze medal with his partner Paul McDowell in the coxless pairs competition.

External links
 profile

1901 births
1991 deaths
American male rowers
Rowers at the 1928 Summer Olympics
Olympic bronze medalists for the United States in rowing
Medalists at the 1928 Summer Olympics